Raja Lala Deen Dayal (1844–1905; also written as 'Din Dyal' and 'Diyal' in his early years), famously known as Raja Deen Dayal) was an Indian photographer. His career began in the mid-1870s as a commissioned photographer; eventually he set up studios in Indore, Mumbai and Hyderabad. He became the court photographer to the sixth Nizam of Hyderabad, Mahbub Ali Khan, Asif Jah VI, who awarded him the title Raja Bahadur Musavvir Jung Bahadur, and he was appointed as the photographer to the Viceroy of India in 1885.

He received the Royal Warrant from Queen Victoria in 1897.

Early life and education 
Deen Dayal was born in Sardhana, Uttar Pradesh, near Meerut in a family of jewellers. He received technical training at Thomason College of Civil Engineering at Roorkee (now IIT Roorkee) in 1866 as an engineer in lower subordinate class.

Career
In 1866, Deen Dayal entered government service as head estimator and draughtsman in the Department of Works Secretariat Office in Indore. Meanwhile, he took up photography. His first patron in Indore was Maharaja Tukoji Rao II of Indore state, who in turn introduced him to Sir Henry Daly, agent to the Governor General for Central India (1871–1881) and the founder of Daly College, who encouraged his work, along with the Maharaja himself who encouraged him to set up his studio in Indore. Soon he was getting commissions from Maharajas and the British Raj. The following year he was commissioned to photograph the governor general's tour of Central India. In 1868, Deen Dayal founded his studio – Lala Deen Dayal & Sons – and was subsequently commissioned to photograph temples and palaces of India. He established studios in Indore (Mid 1870s), Secunderabad (1886) and Bombay (1896).

In 1875–76, Deen Dayal photographed the Royal Tour of the Prince and Princess of Wales. In the early 1880s he travelled with Sir Lepel Griffin through Bundelkhand, photographing the ancient architecture of the region. Griffin commissioned him to do archaeological photographs: The result was a portfolio of 86 photographs, known as "Famous Monuments of Central India".

The next year he retired from government service and concentrated on his career as a professional photographer. Deen Dayal became the court photographer to the sixth Nizam of Hyderabad in 1885. Soon afterward he moved from Indore to Hyderabad. In the same year he was appointed as the photographer to the Viceroy of India. In time, the Nizam of Hyderabad conferred the honorary title of Raja upon him. It was at this time that Dayal created the firm Raja Deen Dayal & Sons in Hyderabad.

Deen Dayal was appointed photographer to Queen Victoria in 1897.

In 1905–1906, Raja Deen Dayal accompanied the Royal Tour of the Prince and Princess of Wales.

Legacy

The Lala Deen Dayal studios' collection of 2,857 glass plate negatives was bought by the Indira Gandhi National Centre for the Arts (IGNCA), New Delhi in 1989. Today it is the largest repository of his work. A large collection including celebrated images of the 1870s' famine are with the Peabody Essex Museum, US and the Alkazi collection in Delhi. In 2010, a retrospective exhibition of his work was held at IGNCA, curated by Jyotindra Jain.

In 2006, a curated collection of Raja Deen Dayal's photographs was exhibited at the Salar Jung Museum during the Times Hyderabad Festival; subsequently in November, the Ministry of Communications, Department of Posts released a commemorative stamp honouring him; the ceremony was held at Jubilee Hall, Hyderabad.

Gallery
Photographs taken by Deen Dayal in the 1880s, sourced from the British Library, George Curzon's Collection: Views of HH the Nizam's Dominions, Hyderabad, Deccan, 1892.

Notes

References 

 
 Canadian Centre for Architecture; Collections Online, s.v. “Dayal, Lala Deen”, cited 18 August 2006.
 
 
 Union List of Artist Names, s.v. "Dayal, Lala Deen", cited 18 August 2006.

Further reading
 Princely India: Photographs by Raja Deen Dayal, 1884–1910, by Deen Dayal (Author), Clark Worswick. Knopf, 1980. .
 Raja Deen Dayal : Prince of Photographers, by Narendra Luther, Sureshchand Deendayal. Hyderabadi, 2003. .
 Lala Deen Dayal: the eminent Indian photographer, 1844–1910, Deen Dayal (Raja), London Borough of Camden. Libraries & Arts Dept., 2002.
 Raja Deen Dayal Collection at Alkazi Foundation

External links
 
 
 Lala Deen Dayal, resource website
 Documentary

1844 births
1905 deaths
Pioneers of photography
People from Meerut district
Indian nature photographers
19th-century Indian photographers
Photography in India
Photographers from Uttar Pradesh
20th-century Indian photographers
Architectural photographers
Indian portrait photographers